Frederick David Linley Penny FRCO MBE (29 September 1896 – 1978) was an organist based in England.

Life
He was born in Gainsborough on 29 September 1896, the son of Arthur Penny and his wife Ada. He was educated at Queen Elizabeth's High School in Gainsborough.

He was also Conductor of the Prittlewell Musical Society, and teacher of piano at Westcliff High School for Boys.

He was awarded MBE for services to Music.

He was awarded Honorary Life membership of the Royal School of Church Music in 1965.

Appointments

Assistant organist at Lincoln Cathedral 1917 - 1921
Organist of St. Mary's Church, Prittlewell 1921 - 1977

References

1896 births
1978 deaths
English organists
British male organists
People educated at Queen Elizabeth's High School
Members of the Order of the British Empire
People from Gainsborough, Lincolnshire
Fellows of the Royal College of Organists
20th-century organists
20th-century British male musicians
20th-century British musicians